Elnur is a given name. Notable people with the name include:

Elnur Abduraimov (born 1994), Uzbekistani Kazakh boxer in the lightweight division
Elnur Allahverdiyev (born 1983), football defender from Azerbaijan
Elnur Amanov (born 1977), Azerbaijani taekwondo athlete
Elnur Aslanov (born 1977), Azerbaijani political scientist, author and businessman
Elnur Aslanov (wrestler) (born 1983), Azerbaijani wrestler
Elnur Hüseynov (born 1987), Azerbaijani singer
Elnur Jafarov (born 1997), Azerbaijani football player
Elnur Majidli, Azerbaijani democracy activist and blogger based in Paris, France
Elnur Mammadli (born 1988), Azerbaijani judoka